Phraates ( Frahāt) was a Parthian prince, who was one of the eldest sons of Phraates IV.

In 10/9 BC, seeking to secure the throne for her son Phraataces, Musa convinced Phraates IV to send his four first-born sons (Vonones, Phraates, Seraspandes and Rhodaspes) to Rome in order to prevent conflict over his succession. The Roman emperor Augustus used this as propaganda depicting the submission of Parthia to Rome, listing it as a great accomplishment in his Res Gestae Divi Augusti. During his stay in Rome, Phraates was the patron of a temple at Nemi, possibly devoted to Isis. In 35 AD, Phraates attempted to take the Parthian throne from Artabanus II, but died from illness shortly after reaching the Parthian realm.

References

Sources 
 
 
 
  
 
 
 

35 deaths
1st-century BC Iranian people
1st-century Iranian people
1st-century BC births
Parthian princes